Broomfield is a hamlet in Wiltshire, England.

External links

Hamlets in Wiltshire